"Getaway" is a single by R&B/funk band Earth, Wind & Fire released in 1976 on Columbia Records. The song reached No. 1 on the Billboard Hot Soul Songs chart and No. 12 on the Billboard Hot 100 chart. "Getaway" also peaked at No. 12 on the Billboard Dance Singles charts.

Overview
Getaway was produced by Maurice White and Charles Stepney and composed by Beloyd Taylor and Peter Cor Belenky.

An instrumental version of Getaway was the single's b-side. Getaway also came upon EWF's 1976 studio album Spirit.

Critical reception
Joe McEwen of Rolling Stone said "Getaway, a current pop smash, is EWF at its best. The theme is in line with urban escapist classics like 'Up on the Roof' and 'World of Fantasy', with pyramid mumbo-jumbo temporarily laid aside. A propulsive funk track laced with dizzying changes makes the song one of the most sophisticated pop hits in recent memory". Record World said that "A tapestry of electronics and syncopated vocals provides an inertia that should send the song skyrocketing to the top." Ed Hogan of Allmusic described Getaway as a "fantastically frantic jam". He also noted that "listen to the opening horn blasts which could be termed assaultive if this wasn't such a cut as well as the earth-shaking energy that's released on the track, it's easily one of the band's most sensational sides." Music Week declared that the song "opens proceedings in fine style, with Philip Bailey's falsetto sweetening its funky rhythms".

Chart history

Certifications

Samples
Getaway was sampled by Poor Righteous Teachers on the song "Strictly Ghetto". 
The song was also sampled by Papoose and Sheek Louch Featuring Busta Rhymes, Raekwon and Young Chris on the song Power Cypher.
It was also sampled on the Boards of Canada album Music Has the Right to Children, on the track Sixtyten.

Cover Versions
1977: The Salsoul Orchestra released an instrumental cover

1999: The Getaway People was released in Muppets From Space when the Muppets free Gonzo and try to escape from the cops. It’s also released in the soundtrack

References

1976 singles
1976 songs
Earth, Wind & Fire songs
Columbia Records singles
Song recordings produced by Maurice White